Go on Country – Social Integration Party is a Peruvian political party. Founded in the northern city of Santiago de Chuco, La Libertad in 2000, the party nominated Ulises Humala, brother of future President Ollanta Humala, for the presidency in the 2006 general election, in the election, the party won 1.1% of the popular vote but no seats in the Congress of the Republic. The presidential ticket itself attained 0.2%, placing fourteenth nationally and subsequently lost its registration.

In 2020, almost 15 years since its last participation in a general election, economist Hernando de Soto registered in the party in order to run for the presidency at the 2021 general election. He would end up placing 4th in the race.

History
In early 2005, the party registered in the National Elections Jury and participated in the 2006 general election, launching Ulises Humala as its presidential nominee. At the legislative elections held on 9 April 2006, the party won 1.1% of the popular vote but no seats in the Congress of the Republic. The presidential ticket itself attained 0.2%, placing fourteenth nationally.

Upon losing the formal registration as a political organization, it had a new re-founding stage that took place on May 10, 2017, after several years, culminating in a new registration on the same year.

In the legislative election held on 26 January 2020, the party won 2.5% of the popular vote but no seats in the Congress of the Republic, as it failed to pass once again the 5% electoral threshold. In the legislative election held on 11 April 2021, the party won 7.5% of the popular vote and 7 seats in the Congress of the Republic, as it was able to pass the 5% electoral threshold.

Ideology
Initially, Go on Country stood for social democracy, social conservatism, and ethnocacerism under Humala. However, the party's ideology has begun to change in recent years, particularly after the party's refounding in 2017, as it regained its registration at the National Jury of Elections. Since Hernando de Soto's presidential run in 2021, the party has adopted a far-right political position. Representatives of the party signed the Madrid Charter, an anti-leftist manifesto organized by the far-right Spanish party Vox. Economically, the party embraces classical liberalism and economic liberalism, generally supporting free markets. 

The party does not have an official stance on social issues as it once did, as can be evidenced by the fact that the respective leading figures for de Soto's presidential campaign, Instituto Político para la Libertad Peru (IPL) vice president, Beltrán Gomez Hijar, and IPL member and congressman Alejandro Cavero, have supported pro-LGBT and pro-choice causes, whereas congresswoman Adriana Tudela, daughter of former Vice President Francisco Tudela, is opposed to abortion.

Under de Soto's leadership, the party is defined by analysts and pundits as right-leaning on the political spectrum. According to Georgetown University political scientist Eliana Carlín, de Soto was the one who chose the party to run, and the party welcomed him due to his international prominence in the economic academia. In her opinion, the party is an "electoral vehicle" that reached an agreement with de Soto and that "they are not interested in ideology".

Controversies 
Avanza País, in a journalistic column of RPP, was accused of surrogacy due to the incorporation of members who had no relationship with the party months prior. Despite this, party president Pedro Cenas rejected the notion of his party functioning as a surrogate and stated that "politics is not a commodity, but an act of faith and integration".

Election results

Presidential election

Elections to the Congress of the Republic

Regional and municipal elections

References

Conservative parties in Peru
Political parties established in 2000
2000 establishments in Peru